中央高速 may refer to:

Central Expressway, Singapore (中央高速公路), an expressway in Singapore
Chūō Expressway (中央自動車道), an expressway in Japan
Jungang Expressway (中央高速道路), an expressway in South Korea